Thirst Aid Kit is a podcast about celebrity lust and sexual desire hosted by journalist Bim Adewunmi and writer Nichole Perkins. The podcast premiered on November 1, 2017, and the finale episode aired on September 17, 2020. It was officially produced by BuzzFeed until January 2019 and was picked up by Slate in September 2019. 

Thirst Aid Kit was named to "best podcast" lists by Time and Entertainment Weekly.

History

Development 
Adewunmi and Perkins worked together at BuzzFeed and mutually enjoyed discussing pop culture and their celebrity sexual interests. This encouraged them to pitch the idea of a podcast about celebrity crushes to BuzzFeed executives.

The purpose of Thirst Aid Kit (TAK) is to openly discuss celebrities they find attractive and do so in an unabashed manner. According to Perkins, "It's really important to give women a space to show what we are interested in and what women want." They also use TAK to highlight people whose work may be well known, but their face is less familiar, such as director Ryan Coogler. The name Thirst Aid Kit refers to the slang meaning of the word thirst, which refers to sexual desire. They refer to their fan base as "thirst buckets."

Production 
The first episode premiered on November 1, 2017, as a production of BuzzFeed. The show is produced by Keisha "TK" Dutes.

On January 25, 2019, it was announced that BuzzFeed would no longer produce the podcast and the hosts are currently looking for a new sponsor. One day prior, BuzzFeed announced company-wide layoffs which eliminated 15% of their staff.

In August 2019, it was announced that Slate had picked up the podcast. It relaunched through the company on September 26. Adewunmi and Perkins chose to partner with Slate because they "came to [the pair] knowledgeable about the podcast."

On September 17, 2020, the Thirst Aid Kit Twitter stated that the weekly podcast had ended and the episode released that day was the finale. The hosts also noted that they had decided to end the podcast mutually. In another tweet the account stated that live events and movie nights could take place in the future.

BFI series dispute 
In February 2020, BFI announced a forthcoming series called Thirst: Female Desire on Screen that had similar artwork to the TAK logo and a similar description. Journalist Musa Okwonga and Twitter users accused BFI of stealing the concept.

Format
Each episode typically focuses on a single celebrity who the hosts find sexually attractive. The podcast begins and ends with either host reading an original short passage of fan fiction, which they call a drabble. The short reading features the focal "thirst object" in an intimate, and sometimes sexual, situation with the writer. Next, they explain what makes the actor desirable. Finally, they dissect the actor's persona in the context of Hollywood and society at large.

Guests 
Thirst Aid Kit sometimes features an interview with the person who the episode is about, such as Charlie Cox and Rahul Kohli. On January 28, 2018, the hosts had a phone interview with Chris Evans, who was on the set of Avengers: Infinity War. Evans made comments about not perceiving himself as "hot," which were picked up by media outlets such as E!, W, and InStyle.

Other media 
TAK also hosts live events such as "Thirsty Movie Nights." They hosted a live interview with Daniel Dae Kim at 2020 Sundance.

Reception 
The podcast received positive reception. In an article on feminist podcast recommendations, Evette Dionne of Bitch said of the show, "Whether it's reading delicious fan fiction, a staple at the beginning of most episodes, or offering thirst recommendations, Thirst Aid Kit is incredibly entertaining." Becca James of Vulture wrote that the show "is as much about the laughs as it is about the lust. Numerous times throughout the podcast, the hosts banter wittily, but it's the concluding fanfic wars that lend themselves to uproarious laughter." In a similarly positive review, Marnie Shure of The A.V. Club wrote, "Giggle-inducing and surprisingly moving, Thirst Aid Kit has been an essential addition to the BuzzFeed network of podcasts." Sydney Scott of Essence noted that the hosts' "warmth and banter" is a positive feature of the show. Byshera Williams wrote in a positive review for Bust, "By addressing the work that each man has created, discussing representation in film, asking why there are not more black women in romantic comedies, and writing fanfic, they weaponize their thirst for good."

The show was also recommended by Mashable and Vanity Fair.

Accolades 
Best Fan Community, The A.V. Club (2018)
 Best Podcasts of 2018, Entertainment Weekly
 The 50 Best Podcasts to Listen to Right Now, Time (2018)

References

External links 

 on Slate.com

Audio podcasts
Sexuality and society
Sexual fantasies
Fan fiction
2017 podcast debuts
2020 podcast endings
BuzzFeed
American podcasts
Feminist podcasts